Worms 4 is a turn-based tactics game made by Team17 released for iOS and Android devices on September 3, 2015.

Gameplay 
In Worms 4, up to three teams of worms take turns maneuvering a 2D map using weapons and items in order to eliminate the opposing teams. The game features a single-player campaign designed to gradually introduce game mechanics, and three multiplayer options consisting of a battle against the AI, hotseat, and online matchmaking.

Reception

Worms 4 received positive reviews. It has a score of 74/100 on Metacritic.

148Apps Jennifer Allen praised the single player campaign and daily challenges, but noted that the online multiplayer mode "is frustratingly quiet and there’s no sign of asynchronous multiplayer which would have combated such issues." Gamezebo's Nadia Oxford notes that the game continues the old-fashioned combat from the series but also found issues with the online multiplayer, noting that "the server has a hard time finding other live opponents, and generally has connection issues even if you’re beside a strong Wi-Fi signal."

References

2015 video games
Android (operating system) games
Artillery video games
iOS games
Video games developed in the United Kingdom
Worms games